JAIKO is a single released with collaboration between singer Eiko Shimamiya and songwriter Jakob Savanholm. The single is released on October 27, 2013. All of the songs are composed by Jakob Savanholm while the lyrics are written by Eiko Shimamiya.

Track listing
"Boffier" ~Ki wo Ueta Otoko~
Composition: Jakob Savanholm
Lyrics/Arrangement: Eiko Shimamiya
"Kite"
Composition: Jakob Savanholm
Lyrics/Arrangement: Eiko Shimamiya

References

J-pop songs
2013 singles